The Hammersmith Palais de Danse, in its last years simply named Hammersmith Palais, was a dance hall and entertainment venue in Hammersmith, London, England that operated from 1919 until 2007. It was the first palais de danse  to be built in Britain. In 2009, it was named by the Brecon Jazz Festival as one of twelve venues which had made the most important contributions to jazz music in the United Kingdom.

The Palais occupied a large site on the A219 at 242 Shepherd's Bush Road, London W6, near the circular system under the A4 Hammersmith flyover. The area has two London Underground stations, a bus station, and the road network at Hammersmith Broadway.

History

Built in 1910 on a site formerly occupied by a tram shed for London United Tramways, the Brook Green Roller Skating Rink, which had been closed since 1915, was acquired at the end of the First World War by North American entrepreneurs Howard Booker and Frank Mitchell, to convert it into a place to host ballroom dancing and various kinds of dance bands, among which were the new jazz bands. This first incarnation of the Hammersmith Palais was the work of architect Bertie Crewe. Its Chinese-style decoration featured lacquered columns, fretwork and a pagoda roof with silk lanterns; in the centre of the expensive sprung dance floor, made of Canadian maple, was a model mountain with a replica Chinese village and a fountain; while at each end thereof, was a low-rise bandstand encased in glass, to allow two bands to play alternate numbers for the dancers. The venue, which also featured a restaurant and a café, was considered at the time to be the largest and most luxurious establishment of its kind in Europe. The Hammersmith Palais de Danse opening night took place on 28 November 1919. Nick LaRocca's Original Dixieland Jazz Band, in those days on tour from America, played regularly at the Palais from that first night until June 1920. Many of the famous jazz stars of the day would appear in concert there, including American jazz singer Adelaide Hall, who performed at the venue during the week from 27 March to 2 April 1939, accompanied by Fela Sowande and his Florida Club Orchestra.

During the Great Depression, while dance halls saw a reduction in attendance, ice skating, instead, came into fashion and replaced dancing as the most popular leisure activity. As a result, the Palais site was converted into an ice rink, which was opened on 30 December 1929, with the original London Lions ice hockey team using it as a base. However, that skate craze proved short-lived, and by late 1934 the rink was reverted to a dance hall. A new maple dance floor at a cost of £5,000 was installed in the venue.

In 1959, Joe Loss and his Orchestra, with singers Rose Brennan, Ross MacManus and Larry Gretton, became the resident dance band at the Palais. For the next decade, they were a regular feature every night, except on Monday's "Record Night" when only recorded music was played and no alcohol was served from the bar. The stage and rehearsal room were within earshot of the Chief Superintendent's office in Hammersmith Police Station, leading one of its occupants to observe "where else can visitors to a police station be soothed by the sound of famous dance bands?". In 1960, the Mecca organisation acquired the Palais. Other house bands during the 1960s and 1970s included Andy Ross, Ken Mackintosh, Tony Evans, and Zodiac. On many Saturday nights, in excess of 2,000 people would visit the venue. One of the features was a huge revolving stage with a band on each side (this also caused a number of accidents when microphones and stands were left on the revolve).

The Hammersmith Palais remained a popular dance venue from its start to the late 1980s, from then on hosting mainly live music gigs, but also dance nights and private events. The venue accommodated the popular School-Disco club night with its resident band, On-On, which subsequently moved to the London Forum in Kentish Town. Promoters Onyx Promotions championed Brit-Asian bands and DJs, including DCS, Heera, Juggy D, Panjabi Hit Squad, Premi, RDB, Rishi Rich and Xzecutive/San-j Sanj. The Students' Union at Imperial College School of Medicine frequently hired the Palais as a venue for student nights.

The Palais played host to countless artists; among them Bill Haley & His Comets (1974), the Beatles, the Rolling Stones, The Who, David Bowie, the Sex Pistols, Elvis Costello and the Attractions, the Cure, U2, the Jesus and Mary Chain, the Fall, Robert Plant & the Strange Sensation, Hanoi Rocks, Big Bang and Kylie Minogue and the Police. "There was the night [in 1979] when we drove in an armoured military vehicle from our show at the Hammersmith Odeon to another the same night at the Hammersmith Palais," recalled Police drummer Stewart Copeland, "while the people from both concerts were all on the street."

Bands such as PiL, the Cramps and Soft Cell, who played their "farewell" concerts there in January 1984, made the venue popular for London gig-goers.

From 1999 to 2003, the Palais was owned by the Po Na Na Group, which converted it into a themed nightclub called Po Na Na Hammersmith.

Closure and demolition

On 20 March 2007, despite its importance to Britain's cultural history, the Hammersmith Palais was condemned for demolition. Among the artists playing the last concerts at the venue were Kasabian, Idlewild, and Jamie T. On 31 March, the unnamed Damon Albarn-fronted band, informally known as The Good, the Bad & the Queen, did a show which was promoted as the venue's official send-off. However, the following evening, 1 April (scheduled before it was known that the building was to be sold), there was a performance by the Fall, which was also promoted as the Palais' last night. A recording and a video of this concert was subsequently released as the live album Last Night at The Palais. In the end, none of these events was truly the last: the final gig at the Hammersmith Palais took place on 3 May 2007, and was by Groove Armada to launch their album Soundboy Rock.

Film producer and director Richard Weller made a documentary for BBC Television about the venue's history, titled Last Man at the Palais. It was first screened on BBC Four on Christmas Eve 2007. Near the end of the film, ballroom dancer Lyndon Wainwright performs "The Last Waltz" on the dance floor of the Palais.

Following its closure as a music venue, proposals for the site included use as an office and restaurant complex, or a students' hall of residence. Hammersmith and Fulham London Borough Council had been expected to rule on the proposed demolition and development in November 2009; however, on 27 October 2009, the council rejected plans to turn the Hammersmith Palais site into student flats.

In July 2010, the Planning Inspectorate held a week-long public inquiry and rejected an appeal by a development company against a council decision to block a proposed development. The developers were London & Regional (Hammersmith), who were given leave to submit an amended application.

The Palais was finally demolished in May 2012. A new building was constructed on the site, and in September 2013 opened as a luxury student hall of residence, advertised as being on the site of the Hammersmith Palais.

In popular culture
Michael Monroe's 1993–1994 band Demolition 23 recorded a track called "Hammersmith Palais" on their 1994 self-titled album. The song, a nostalgic description of the 1980s club scene in London, was written by Monroe, Jude Wilder and Little Steven (Steven Van Zandt).

The venue provides inspiration for the Dan Wilde track "Hammersmith Palais", from his 2016 album "Rhythm on the City Wall".

The venue is named in several songs, including:
 The Emerson, Lake & Palmer song "Benny the Bouncer", from their 1973 album Brain Salad Surgery.
 The Clash song "(White Man) In Hammersmith Palais", inspired by Joe Strummer and Don Letts attending a reggae all-nighter at the venue; Strummer also managed to get thrown out one Thursday afternoon for gaining entry without permission.
 The Ian Dury and the Blockheads song "Reasons to be Cheerful, Part 3".
 The Elvis Costello and the Attractions song "London's Brilliant Parade", from their 1994 album Brutal Youth; Costello would frequently visit the Palais as a youth, watching from the balcony his father Ross MacManus perform with the Joe Loss Orchestra.

Notes

References

Works cited

Further reading
 Haslam, Dave (2015). Life After Dark: A History of British Nightclubs and Music Venues. New York City: Simon & Schuster. .

Other media
 Dixon, Terence (1973). May I Have the Pleasure?: A Profile of Hammersmith Palais (TV documentary miniseries). Thames Television.
 Weller, Richard (2007). Last Man in Hammersmith Palais (TV documentary). BBC Four.

External links
 

Articles
 Haslam, Dave (29 August 2015). "Boogie Wonderlands: Five of the Most Influential Nightclubs of the Last 100 Years". The Guardian.

Videos
 The Fall Last Night At The Palais Live 2007 (concert film, part 1/6). YouTube.

Images
 Hammersmith and Fulham London Borough Council (10 March 2008). Photographic record of the Hammersmith Palais. London Borough of Hammersmith and Fulham.
 GES019 (June 2010). "GES019 – Hammersmith Palais Theatre" (photo gallery). Guerrilla Exploring.
 De-Keyzer, Amy; WLON (26 February 2015). "History of Hammersmith Palais" (photo gallery). MyLondon.

1919 establishments in England
2007 disestablishments in England
Former music venues in London
Hammersmith
Nightclubs in London
Buildings and structures demolished in 2012
Demolished buildings and structures in London